Byasa adamsoni, or Adamson's rose, is a species of butterfly from the family Papilionidae that is found in Burma, Thailand, Laos, Cambodia and Vietnam.

Etymology
It is named for the collector Captain Adamson R.E.

References

Grose-Smith, H. (1886). Descriptions of four new Species of Butterflies from Burmah. Annals and Magazine of Natural History 18(5):149-151.

External links
Samui Butterflies

Butterflies described in 1886
Byasa
Butterflies of Asia
Taxa named by Henley Grose-Smith